State Route 285 (SR 285) is a west-east state highway located in the southwestern part of the U.S. state of Georgia.

Route description
SR 285 begins at an intersection with SR 91 southwest of Donalsonville, in Seminole County, where the roadway continues as Butler Ferry Road. The route heads southeast along River Road for a short distance before turning and running nearly due east through rural portions of Seminole County. On its way through Seminole County, it intersects SR 39. Almost immediately after entering Decatur County, the route meets its eastern terminus, an intersection with US 84/SR 38 just west of Brinson.

History

Major intersections

See also

References

External links

285
Transportation in Seminole County, Georgia
Transportation in Decatur County, Georgia